The 1976 Virginia Slims of Akron  was a women's tennis tournament played on indoor carpet courts at the Richfield Coliseum in Akron, Ohio in the United States that was part of the 1976 Virginia Slims circuit. It was the fourth edition of the tournament and was held from February 3 through February 8, 1976. Third-seeded Evonne Goolagong won the singles title and earned $15,000 first-prize money.

Finals

Singles
 Evonne Goolagong defeated  Virginia Wade 6–2, 3–6, 6–2
 It was Goolagong's 2nd singles title of the year and the 64th of her career.

Doubles
 Brigitte Cuypers /  Mona Guerrant defeated  Glynis Coles /  Florenţa Mihai 6–4, 7–6

Prize money

References

Virginia Slims of Akron
Virginia Slims of Akron
Virginia Slims of Akron
Virginia Slims of Akron
Tennis tournaments in Ohio